Permanent Representatives of Italy to the United Nations from October 1, 1947

References 

 
Italy